Rob N Roll is an upcoming Hong Kong action comedy film produced by Derek Yee directed by Albert Mak. The film stars Aaron Kwok as a robber who plans a heist only to be foiled by two dispirited, middle-aged men played by Gordon Lam and Richie Jen.

Production for Rob N Roll officially began in November 2021.

Plot
A fierce robber has plotted a major heist. But unfortunately, his plan was unintentionally foiled by two dispirited middle-aged best friends, and the stolen cash disappears. As a result, the trio has to run from the pursue of a policewoman, as well as engaging in a firearm in order to reclaim the stolen cash, putting their life on the line.

Cast
Aaron Kwok as a bucktoothed, professional wrestler and robber who plans a major heist.
Gordon Lam as taxi driver who unintentionally foils the heist of Kwok's character.
Richie Jen as the best friend of Lam's character, who also takes part in foiling the heist of Kwok's character.
Maggie Cheung Ho-yee as a policewoman on the trail of Kwok, Lam and Jen's characters.
Nancy Wu as the pregnant wife of Lam's character.
Lam Suet
Leung Chung-hang
Calvert Fu
Ansonbean
Mike Tsang
Kathy Wong
John Chiang, Jr
David Chiang
Deno Cheung
Paulyn Sun
Michael Wong
Paw Hee-ching as the mother of Lam's character who often quarrels with his daughter-in-law played by Wu 
Lo Hoi-pang
Ting Yue

Production
News of the project first appeared in April 2021 when the Film Production Financing Scheme of the Hong Kong Film Development Fund approved HK$8.4 million for the film, with Albert Mak attached as director and Gordon Lam and Stephy Tang set to star. On 27 October 2021, Aaron Kwok revealed to the press that he will starring in the film as a robber and will be co-starring with Lam and Richie Jen.

Principal photography for Rob N Roll began in November 2021. On 12 November, filming of a robbery and vehicular crash scene took place in Temple Street, Hong Kong with actors  Kwok, Maggie Cheung Ho-yee and Calvert Fu. There, Kwok revealed a bucktoothed look for his character in the film.

On 20 December 2021, filming a firearm shootout scene took place at the Kwai Tsing Container Terminals. That day, Kwok revealed to the media that his bucktooth look was his own idea he suggested after reading the film's script and noticing black comedy elements being present, while he will also be wearing a cauliflower ear made from special effects as his character is also a professional wrestler. Lam also unveiled his long-haired look as a taxi driver while Jen unveiled his grizzled look wearing a gray wig. Cheung reveals that she will be firing a gun on screen for the first time in this film while Nancy Wu also give details about his role as Lam's wife who will be quarreling with her mother-in-law played by Paw Hee-ching. David Chiang, who appears in the film alongside his real-life son, John Chiang, Jr stated he had no clue his half-brother Derek Yee was serving as the film's producer before his son was cast.

See also
Aaron Kwok filmography

References

External links
Official Facebook page

Upcoming films
2020s action comedy films
2020s black comedy films
2020s heist films
Hong Kong action comedy films
Hong Kong black comedy films
Hong Kong heist films
Police detective films
Cantonese-language films
Films set in Hong Kong
Films shot in Hong Kong